Peñas Blancas Wildlife Refuge, is a protected area in Costa Rica, managed under the Central Pacific Conservation Area, it was created in 1985 by law 7018, Art 28.

References 

Nature reserves in Costa Rica
Protected areas established in 1985
1985 establishments in Costa Rica